The Constitution (Amendment No. 26) Act 1935 (act no. 12 of 1935, previously bill no. 52 of 1934) was an Act of the Oireachtas of the Irish Free State amending the Constitution of the Irish Free State which had been adopted in 1922. It removed the restriction on the jurisdiction on citizenship law to the effect that citizenship rights only applied within the jurisdiction of the Free State.

It amended Article 3 by the deletion of the words struck out below and insertion of the words emphasised in bold:

Section 34 of the Irish Nationality and Citizenship Act 1935, enacted shortly after this amendment, provided,

The Amendment became obsolete on the repeal of the 1922 Constitution on the adoption of the Constitution of Ireland in 1937, and was repealed by the Statute Law Revision Act 2016.

References

1935 in Irish law
Acts of the Oireachtas of the 1930s
Amendments to the Constitution of the Irish Free State
Ireland and the Commonwealth of Nations
Irish nationality law